Nils Holm (born 30 October 1969) is a former professional tennis player from Sweden.

Holm, a doubles specialist, never made a final on the ATP Tour but reached the semi-finals at Bastad in 1989.

He teamed up with his brother Henrik at the 1993 US Open, where they were defeated in the opening round by Wayne Ferreira and Michael Stich. His brother was also his partner in his only other Grand Slam appearance, at the 1997 Wimbledon Championships. On this occasion they made it into the second round, with a win over the British pairing of Martin Lee and James Trotman. They were then eliminated by two Australians, Mark Philippoussis and Patrick Rafter in straight sets.

Challenger titles

Doubles: (7)

References

External links

1969 births
Living people
Swedish male tennis players
20th-century Swedish people